Byun Jae-sub  (born September 17, 1975) is a South Korean footballer

He graduated in Jeonju University, He was the K-League Top Assistor of 1999 season

Honours

Individual
 K-League Top Assistor : 1999

References
 Byun Jae-sub Interview

External links
 

1975 births
K League 1 players
Jeonbuk Hyundai Motors players
Jeju United FC players
South Korean footballers
Living people
Association football midfielders